"Beautiful Love" is the hit single from the debut album by Christian rock band The Afters, I Wish We All Could Win. The song was later used by MTV as the theme song to its reality show 8th and Ocean.

Critical success 

Certified Gold by the RIAA for Digital Sales in 2006.
The single's presence in the TV show 8th & Ocean prompted a six-week surge in which Beautiful Love was downloaded 90,000 times.
Nielsen SoundScan named Beautiful Love as the top downloaded song on the inspirational chart for 2006.
No. 1 R&R Christian CHR single
Beautiful Love spent 9+ weeks on the iTunes top-100 downloaded songs chart (peaking at #14)

Charts 

Peaked on the Billboard Hot 100 chart at #55
Peaked on the Billboard Pop 100 chart at #43
Peaked on the Billboard Hot Digital Songs chart at #23

Awards

In 2006, the song was nominated for a Dove Award for Rock/Contemporary Recorded Song of the Year at the 37th GMA Dove Awards.
In 2005, the song won the mtvU Award for Best Streaming Video.

Television and film 
"Beautiful Love" was used as the theme song for the MTV reality series 8th & Ocean.
Song appeared in Just My Luck.

References

External links
CBN overview
[ Billboard Charts]

2005 debut singles
The Afters songs
Television drama theme songs
2005 songs
Epic Records singles